Petroleum-Gas University of Ploiești (Universitatea Petrol-Gaze, UPG) is a public university in Ploiești, Romania. Founded in 1948 under the name of Institute of Petroleum and Gas, in response to the increasing industrialization in Romania and the lack of high level education in the petroleum and gas fields, it gained fast the status of university, hence changing its name to the actual one in 1993 and extending with new faculties and departments in the field of economic sciences and humanities.

The UPG's academic structure includes 5 faculties: Faculty of Petroleum and Gas Engineering, Faculty of Mechanical and Electrical Engineering, Faculty of Petroleum Technology and Petrochemistry, Faculty of Economic Sciences and Faculty of Letters and Sciences.

References

External links
 

Engineering universities and colleges in Romania
Universities in Romania
Ploiești
Petroleum engineering schools
Educational institutions established in 1948
1948 establishments in Romania